Khao Nom Sao (เขานมสาว), "female breast mountain", is a land feature located in Ranong Province, Thailand.

Description

Khao Nom Sao is the highest summit of a rugged mountain massif that stretches roughly from north to south in the Kra Isthmus.
This mountain range represents an important catchment area for many rivers of the Ranong and Chumphon provinces, forming a natural border between both provinces. Khao Daen and Khao Huai Siad, are other prominent peaks of the chain, which is part of the wider Tenasserim Hills.

This mountain is included in the Namtok Ngao National Park (อุทยานแห่งชาติน้ำตกหงาว) and there are hiking trails that allow to enjoy the surrounding scenery.

See also
Breast-shaped hills

References

External links
 Nam Tok Ngao National Park, Royal Forest Department

Geography of Ranong province
Mountains of Thailand
Tenasserim Hills